Ba Yanchuan (born 10 May 1972) is a Chinese wrestler. He competed in the men's Greco-Roman 100 kg at the 1996 Summer Olympics.

References

1972 births
Living people
Chinese male sport wrestlers
Olympic wrestlers of China
Wrestlers at the 1996 Summer Olympics
Place of birth missing (living people)
20th-century Chinese people